Bruno Déprez (born 13 August 1949) is a French sports shooter. He competed in the men's 50 metre pistol event at the 1988 Summer Olympics.

References

1949 births
Living people
French male sport shooters
Olympic shooters of France
Shooters at the 1988 Summer Olympics
Sportspeople from Nord (French department)